Channel 26 refers to several television stations:

Canada
The following television stations operate on virtual channel 26 in Canada:
 CBUFT-DT in Vancouver, British Columbia
 CFTF-DT-10 in Baie-Saint-Paul, Quebec
 CHWI-DT-60 in Windsor, Ontario
 CICO-DT-53 in Belleville, Ontario

Vietnam
The following television stations operate on virtual channel 26 in Vietnam:
TTV26 (THTG now) in My Tho, Tien Giang Province

See also
 Channel 26 virtual TV stations in Mexico
 Channel 26 virtual TV stations in the United States
For UHF frequencies covering 542-548 MHz
 Channel 26 TV stations in Canada
 Channel 26 TV stations in Mexico
 Channel 26 digital TV stations in the United States
 Channel 26 low-power TV stations in the United States

26